Alessandro Forcucci (Popoli, 27 May 1998) is an Italian rugby union player, currently playing for Top12 side Fiamme Oro. He is also an additional player for the Pro14 side Zebre. His preferred position is flanker.

In 2017 and 2018, Forcucci was named in the Italy Under 20 squad.

Zebre
Forcucci was named as an additional player in November 2020 for 2020–21 Pro14 season.  He made his Zebre debut in Round 6 of the 2020–21 Pro14 against Munster.

References

External links
itsrugby.co.uk Profile

1998 births
Living people
Italian rugby union players
Zebre Parma players
Rugby union centres
People from Popoli
Sportspeople from the Province of Pescara